The Trinil Fauna is a biostratigraphic faunal assemblage composed from several Javanese sites by Ralph von Koenigswald. Von Koenigswald assigned the early hominid fossils Java Man to the Trinil Fauna after discovering the main fossil of Java Man, a skullcap catalogued as "Trinil 2", in the same geological horizon.

References

Works cited

See also
 Trinil H. K. Fauna

1891 archaeological discoveries
East Java
Prehistoric Indonesia